Ancylosis euclastella is a species of snout moth in the genus Ancylosis. It was described by Émile Louis Ragonot in 1887. It is found in China.

References

Moths described in 1887
euclastella
Moths of Asia